n.1 or Nº 1 (read as Número 1 in Portuguese) is the debut album of the French-born Portuguese singer David Carreira. It was released on 17 October 2011 on the Portuguese Farol Música label and reached number one on the official Portuguese Albums Chart.

Track listing

Charts

References

2011 debut albums
David Carreira albums